Thierry Rupert (born 23 May 1977 in Gonesse - 10 February 2013 in Le Mans)  was a French basketball player. Rupert had 35 selections for the French national men's basketball team from 2001-2004.

He played his entire career in the French Ligue Nationale de Basket.

References

External links 
 Player on EuroCup website
 Player on FIBA Europe website
  Player on LNB website
  Player on FFBB website

1977 births
2013 deaths
Élan Béarnais players
Élan Chalon players
French men's basketball players
JDA Dijon Basket players
Le Mans Sarthe Basket players
Limoges CSP players
Olympique Antibes basketball players
Paris Racing Basket players
People from Gonesse
SIG Basket players
Sportspeople from Val-d'Oise
Power forwards (basketball)